Antoni Żabko-Potopowicz (9 June 1895 in Oczesa-Rudnia, Chernigov Governorate, Russian Empire – 26 April 1980 in Warsaw) was an economist of agriculture, economic historian, and professor at Warsaw Agricultural University. He was a member of Polish Science Society (Towarzystwo Naukowe Warszawskie) and co-founder of the 1945 incarnation of the Polish Economic Society (Polskie Towarzystwo Ekonomiczne).

Honors
 Cross of Valor (1921)
 Knight's Cross of the Order of Polonia Restituta (1959)
 Officer's Cross of the Order of Polonia Restituta (1967)
 Warsaw University of Life Sciences Agricultural Academy Golden Badge (1969)
 Medal of the 30th anniversary of People's Poland (1974)
 Honorary Badge of the Polish Librarians Association (1976)
 Badge "Meritorious for Forestry and Wood Industry," awarded by the Minister of Forestry and Wood Industry (1976)
 Badge "For merits for the Kielce region" (1979)

Publications
Żabko-Potopowicz published mostly in the Polish Language, often commenting on social agrarian farms from the 18th century to the early 20th century in what is now Poland. 

Additionally, Żabko-Potopowicz edited and contributed to the following publications:
Scientific secretary of publication for 
Chairman of the editorial committee and author of some sections, 
Chairman of the editorial committee,

See also
 List of Poles

References
 
 

1895 births
1980 deaths
20th-century Polish historians
Polish male non-fiction writers
Polish economists